Sihani is a village in Kamsaar, in Ghazipur district, Uttar Pradesh, India. As of 2011 census the main population of the village lived in 18.7 acres and had 220 households.

Historical population

References

Towns and villages in Kamsar